The 'Spartan' is an apple cultivar developed by R. C Palmer and introduced in 1936 from the Federal Agriculture Research Station in Summerland, British Columbia, now known as the Pacific Agri-Food Research Centre - Summerland. The 'Spartan' is notable for being the first new breed of apple produced from a formal scientific breeding program. The apple was supposed to be a cross between two North American cultivars, the 'McIntosh' and the 'Newtown Pippin', but recently, genetic analysis showed the 'Newtown Pippin' was not one of the parents and its identity remains a mystery. The 'Spartan' apple is considered a good all-purpose apple.
The apple is of medium size and has a bright-red blush, but can have background patches of greens and yellows.

Disease susceptibility
Scab: high
Powdery mildew: high
Cedar apple rust: high
Fire blight: medium

Sports and descendants
 'Hunter Spartan', a tetraploid form of 'Spartan'

Gallery

See also 
 List of Canadian inventions and discoveries
 Ambrosia (apple)
 Jubilee apple
 McIntosh (apple)

References

External links

National Fruit Collection page

Apple cultivars